Ozerki is a rural locality (a khutor) and the administrative center of Ozerskoye Rural Settlement, Ilovlinsky District, Volgograd Oblast, Russia. The population was 691 in 2010. There are 10 streets.

Geography 
Ozerki is located in steppe, 34 km northwest of Ilovlya (the district's administrative centre) by road. Viltov is the nearest rural locality.

References 

Rural localities in Ilovlinsky District